The Polish-Catholic Latvian Union of Poles was a political party in Latvia during the inter-war period. It was led by J Wierzbicki.

History
The party was established in 1917. The party first contested national elections alone in 1925, when it won two seats in the 2nd Saeima after the parliamentary elections that year. It retained both seats in the 1928 elections, but saw its vote share fall from 1.7% to 0.4% in the 1931 elections, as it lost its representation in the Saeima.

References

Defunct political parties in Latvia
Political parties established in 1917
Political parties of minorities in Latvia
Catholicism in Latvia
Polish diaspora in Europe
Catholic political parties
Polish diaspora organizations